Lauterecken-Wolfstein is a Verbandsgemeinde ("collective municipality") in the district of Kusel, Rhineland-Palatinate, Germany. The seat of the Verbandsgemeinde is in Lauterecken. It was formed on 1 July 2014 by the merger of the former Verbandsgemeinden Lauterecken and Wolfstein.

The Verbandsgemeinde Lauterecken-Wolfstein consists of the following Ortsgemeinden ("local municipalities"):

{|
|- valign=top
|
 Adenbach
 Aschbach
 Buborn
 Cronenberg
 Deimberg
 Einöllen
 Eßweiler
 Ginsweiler
 Glanbrücken
 Grumbach
 Hausweiler
||
 Hefersweiler 
 Heinzenhausen
 Herren-Sulzbach
 Hinzweiler
 Hohenöllen
 Homberg
 Hoppstädten
 Jettenbach
 Kappeln
 Kirrweiler
 Kreimbach-Kaulbach
||
 Langweiler 
 Lauterecken
 Lohnweiler
 Medard
 Merzweiler
 Nerzweiler
 Nußbach
 Oberweiler im Tal
 Oberweiler-Tiefenbach
 Odenbach
 Offenbach-Hundheim
||
 Reipoltskirchen 
 Relsberg
 Rothselberg
 Rutsweiler an der Lauter
 Sankt Julian
 Unterjeckenbach
 Wiesweiler
 Wolfstein
|}

External links
 Official website

Verbandsgemeinde in Rhineland-Palatinate